Park Bo-young (born February 12, 1990) is a South Korean actress. She is best known for her leading roles in the hit films Scandal Makers (2008), A Werewolf Boy (2012) and On Your Wedding Day (2018), and the television series Oh My Ghost (2015), Strong Girl Bong-soon (2017), Abyss (2019), and Doom at Your Service (2021).

Career

Early career beginnings
Before her official acting debut in 2006, Park appeared in a short film titled Equal in 2005 when she was in middle school. The short film won Challenging Reality Award at the 7th Seoul International Youth Film Festival (SIYFF 2005). She first appeared on television with a public advertisement for Korea Hydro & Nuclear Power when she was in high school.

2006–2010: Debut, breakthrough and hiatus
Park made her official acting debut in the 2006 high school television series Secret Campus alongside fellow newcomer Lee Min-ho. Among the notable projects during the early stage in her career are the historical epic The King and I and Peabody Award-winning teen drama Jungle Fish with Kim Soo-hyun, based on a true story that depicts the pressures placed on students to achieve and gain admission to prestigious colleges and universities.

Park rose to fame after starring opposite Cha Tae-hyun in comedy Scandal Makers, which drew 8.3 million viewers to become the number one top grosser of 2008 and one of Korean cinema's biggest hits. Described by Variety as "excellent" in her role as a spunky teenage mom, Park's much-praised performance swept Best New Actress awards in 2009. She was also dubbed as "Nation's Little Sister" because of its success. She then starred in a short film directed by Lee Hyun-seung, human rights-themed omnibus If You Were Me 4 in 2009.

However, in 2010 she became involved in a series of legal disputes with her then-management agency and a film production company, causing the actress to be tied up in lawsuits and unable to work for the next few years.

2011–2014: Return to big screen and mainstream success

After she was designated the promotional ambassador (called "PiFan Lady") for the 2011 Puchon International Fantastic Film Festival, Park finally ended her four-year absence from the limelight by headlining the 2012 horror thriller Don't Click. Later that year, she starred alongside Song Joong-ki in fantasy romance film A Werewolf Boy, which surpassed 7 million admissions to become one of the most successful Korean melodramas of all time. The song her character sings in the film, "My Prince", was released as a digital single and included in the movie soundtrack.

In 2013, Park joined the cast of Law of the Jungle, a reality-documentary program featuring comedian Kim Byung-man and several celebrities as they explore and survive the New Zealand wilderness.

In a departure from her previous sweet, innocent characters, Park played the tough, potty-mouthed leader of her high school gang in Hot Young Bloods (2014), a teen romantic comedy set in the 1980s. Park, who was born in North Chungcheong Province, said she had fun swearing in southern dialect, though she found it difficult to master, being a mixture of Jeolla and Chungcheong dialects.

2015–2019: Television comeback and continued success
In 2015, she headlined the mystery thriller The Silenced, set in a girls' boarding school during the Japanese occupation. This was followed by dual roles in romantic comedy Oh My Ghost, Park's first television series in seven years. The series was a commercial and critical hit, and garnered the Best Actress award for Park at the 4th APAN Star Awards. She was also dubbed as the "romantic comedy queen" by the Korean press.

Park next played the selfish love interest of a mutant in the black comedy Collective Invention, and an entertainment news cub reporter in the workplace comedy You Call It Passion.

In June 2016, Park was cast as the title role in JTBC's series Strong Girl Bong-soon, premiered in February 2017, where she played a character with superhuman strength. The series became one of the highest rated Korean dramas in cable television history. Due to its popularity, it earned her Korea Reputation Center's highest brand value among Korean TV actors and the highest consumer participation rate in February and March 2017.

In September 2017, Park began filming the romance film On Your Wedding Day which premiered in August 2018. She was reunited with Kim Young-kwang, whom she previously acted with in the 2014 film Hot Young Bloods. The film was a box office hit and received positive reviews.

Park then starred in tvN's series Abyss premiered in May 2019, where she played a beautiful prosecutor who transforms into a plain-looking girl after being revived by a mysterious orb.

She parted ways with her ten-year agency Fides Spatium in December 2019. Two months later, she signed an exclusive contract with BH Entertainment.

2020–present: Recent projects
In December 2020, Park was cast in fantasy romance series Doom at Your Service alongside Seo In-guk, which premiered on May 10, 2021, on tvN. In April 2021, she also began filming Um Tae-hwa's disaster thriller film Concrete Utopia alongside Lee Byung-hun and Park Seo-joon. She is also set to star on the upcoming Netflix series Daily Dose of Sunshine.

Personal life
Park was born in Jeungpyeong, North Chungcheong Province. She is the second of three daughters. Her father served as a soldier in the Special Forces for 34 years. She graduated from Jeungpyeong Elementary School, Jeungpyeong Girls' Middle School, Daeseong Girls' Commercial High School and Dankook University's Department of Performing Arts with a major in Theatre and Film.

On April 26, 2021, she opened her first SNS account in 15 years since her debut. Her first Instagram post received 165,000 likes within 17 hours of its release.

Health
Park's ankle ligaments were torn during a workout before shooting began for TV series Strong Girl Bong-soon. In April 2017, the hospital advised her to wear a cast but she had to use ankle tape and started out with physical therapy instead, due to the ongoing filming. Two months after wrapping up the series, she underwent a twenty-minute minor surgery. On September 6, her agency stated that the actress was in the final stages of rehabilitation and would start filming On Your Wedding Day later that month.

In November 2019, Park announced temporary hiatus to recover from arm injury. She also received surgery to remove a scar on her arm.

Filmography

Discography

Soundtrack

As featured artist

Other ventures

Philanthropy

Park Bo-young has participated in several charitable causes; such as talent donations for ChildFund Korea—Green Umbrella Children's Foundation's "Love, One More" campaign in 2014 and Sandol Green Umbrella Handwriting project in 2017. Since 2013, she has sponsored two children through the Green Umbrella Children's Foundation.

Park participated in the Share Pad Campaign by LG Unicharm's sanitary pad brand Sofy Bodyfit and provided pads to girls from low-income single parents from 2016 until 2019. In May 2017 and April 2019, she held autograph signing events to donate a total of 1.1 million pieces of sanitary pads to Korean Women's Welfare Association as part of the campaign.

On April 15, 2017, Park held an autograph session in Seoul to support an orphanage in Cambodia. It was hosted by Think Nature, a cosmetic brand that she endorsed at that time. All proceeds from the event were donated to support children in Cambodia.

In February 2020, she donated 50 million won to help the fight against COVID-19 during the mass outbreak. In August, she donated 20 million won to support the aid for flood victims through the Hope Bridge Disaster Relief Association. She was also one of the celebrities who participated in 2020 WeAja Flea Market charity auction.

In February 2021, she donated 30 million won to non-profit organization Good Neighbors in celebration of her birthday to provide young girls from low-income families with sanitary items. In July, she donated 100,000 face masks to the North Gyeongsang Province Fire Department through the Hope Bridge Disaster Relief Association.

In February 2022, international development cooperation NGO G-Foundation announced that Park donated 50 million won on her birthday to fund kits with sanitary products for young girls from low-income households. In March, she donated 50 million won to Hope Bridge Disaster Relief Association to help residents affected by the wildfires in Uljin, Gyeongbuk, Samcheok, Gangneung, Donghae, and Yeongwol. Because of her donations, Park became a member of Hope Bridge Disaster Relief Association's major donor club called "Hope Bridge Honors Club" in April 2022.

In February 2023, Park donated 30 million won through the Hope Bridge Korea Disaster Relief Association to provide aid for the 2023 Turkey–Syria earthquake.

Ambassadorship

Awards and nominations

Listicles

Notes

References

External links

 
 Park Bo-young on V Live
 
 
 
 Park Bo-young at BH Entertainment

1990 births
Living people
Dankook University alumni
People from North Chungcheong Province
South Korean child actresses
South Korean Christians
South Korean film actresses
South Korean television actresses
South Korean television personalities
21st-century South Korean actresses
Best New Actress Paeksang Arts Award (film) winners